State Route 23 (SR-23) is a state highway in northern Utah, running for  in Cache County from Wellsville to the Idaho state line on the north end of Cornish.

Route description
SR-23 begins in Wellsville at an intersection with US-89/US-91 in southern Wellsville and heads north through the town. It turns northwest parallel to the Wellsville Mountains to Mendon. It turns north through Mendon and Petersboro. It turns northwest between Cache Butte and the Cutler Reservoir into Cache Junction.

SR-23 then turns north through Cache Junction across the Bear River into Newton. It turns east through the center of Newton, then turns north around Little Mountain through Trenton, Morton, and Cornish to the state line. It continues as County Road D1 in Franklin County, Idaho.

History
The state legislature created SR-142 in 1933, connecting SR-69 (now SR-30) at Petersboro with Newton and Smithfield. SR-142 was moved to the present route to Clarkston in 1941, with the old alignment through downtown Newton to Smithfield becoming SR-218. State Route 164 was also defined in 1933, running south from Petersboro to US-91 in Wellsville. Two years later, State Route 192 was created, running north from SR-142 (now SR-218) east of Newton to SR-61 in Cornish. That part of SR-61 had been added in 1931, heading both east to Cove and north to Idaho. In 1953, SR-164 and SR-192 were combined with SR-142 south of Newton, SR-218 through Newton, and SR-61 north of Cornish to create State Route 23.

Major intersections

References

External links

023
 023